Darband is a village in Deymkaran Rural District, Salehabad District, Bahar County, Hamadan Province, Iran. At the 2006 census, its population was 257, in 59 families.

References 

Populated places in Bahar County